Prof. Dr Hab. Krystyna Chojnicka (born 1951) is a Polish lawyer and political scientist.

She finished her law degree and a PhD in political science at Jagiellonian University.

In 2008, she was voted the dean of the Faculty of Law and Administration at Jagiellonian University.

Works 
Osoba i dzieło Piotra Wielkiego w dziewiętnastowiecznych sporach doktrynalnych o miejsce i przyszłość Rosji w Europie (1988)
Rodowód literacki inteligencji rosyjskiej (1992)
Nauczanie społeczne Kościoła od Leona XIII do Piusa XII (1993)
Narodziny rosyjskiej doktryny państwowej: Zoe Paleolog - między Bizancjum, Rzymem a Moskwą (2001)
Nauka społeczna Kościoła Katolickiego (zarys historii) (2001)

Footnotes

References 

Jagiellonian University alumni
Lawyers from Kraków
Polish political scientists
1951 births
Living people
Polish women academics
Women political scientists